Ziba Pasha qizi Ganiyeva (20 August 1923, Shamakhi, Azerbaijan or in Uzbekistan – 2010, Moscow) was an ethnic Azerbaijani sniper in the Red Army who killed 21 enemy soldiers during World War II. After the war she became a philologist.

Life
Ziba Ganiyeva is Azerbaijani by her father and Uzbek by her mother. In 1937, she was admitted to dance courses at the newly established Uzbek Philharmonia. In 1940, she moved to Moscow to enter the Russian Academy of Theatre Arts, but voluntarily enlisted in the army on 7 November 1941, shortly after the opening of the Eastern Front of World War II. She was accompanied by another sniper, Nina Solova.

During the war, Ganiyeva was a radio operator and a spy who crossed the front line 16 times. She participated in the Battle of Moscow. Ziba's military service was discontinued after she was heavily wounded during the reconnaissance operation in Moscow suburbs in 1942. She was carried off the battlefield and subsequently spent 11 months in hospital.

During the war her photo was featured in Komsomolskaya Pravda and on the cover of Ogonek magazine.

After the war she continued her post-secondary education and, in 1965, received a Candidate of Sciences degree in philology.

Works
Qorkinin dekadentçiliyə və naturalizmə qarşı mübarizəsi (Gorky's Struggle Against Decadence and Naturalism), "Azərbaycan", 1955, №6
О сатире Горького в период первой русской революции (On Gorky's Satire in the First Russian Revolution Period), "Литературный Азербайджан", 1955, №12
Страницы из истории революционной поэзии на урду (Pages from the History of Revolutionary Poetry in Urdu), "Народы Азии и Африки", 1970, №2

References

1923 births
2010 deaths
Azerbaijani military personnel
Soviet military snipers
Soviet military personnel of World War II from Azerbaijan
Women in the Russian and Soviet military
Soviet women in World War II
Recipients of the Order of the Red Star
Recipients of the Order of the Red Banner
People from Shamakhi